Pennsylvania Route 328 (PA 328, designated by the Pennsylvania Department of Transportation as SR 328) is a  state highway located in Tioga and Bradford counties in Pennsylvania. The western terminus is at PA 287 in Tioga Junction. The eastern terminus is at New York State Route 328 (NY 328) at the New York state line near Millerton.

Route description

PA 328 begins at an intersection in Tioga Junction with PA 287. The route progresses eastward as a residential road through Tioga Junction, turning southeastward after Hillside Terrace. After this curve, PA 328 leaves Tioga Junction a two-lane local road through woodlands. The road curves several times from east, southeast and northeast directions before maintaining a southeastward at a field near Burrows Hollow Road. After Lyman Stone Road, PA 328 turning southeastward through forests and fields before curving eastward through fields. At the intersection with Button Hill Road, PA 328 turns to the northeast into Jackson Summit. Starting in Jackson Summit, the route parallels the former right-of-way of the Erie Railroad's Tioga Division, serving as a residential highway through Jackson Summit. At the intersection with Hudson Hill Road, PA 328 turns to the east entering the hamlet of Trowbridge, where it passes to the south of the former Trowbridge station.

After the hamlet of Trowbridge, PA 328 remains a rural highway, turning to the northeast through the fields in the area. After the intersection with Alder Run Road, the highway becomes residential for a short stretch. Soon after, the route enters the census-designated place of Millerton and gains the name of Main Street. PA 328 passes a mix of commercial businesses and residential homes until leaving Millerton after the intersection with Bly Road. The route remains known as Main Street for a short distance, changing names to Hammond Creek Road upon crossing the county line into Bradford County. PA 328 enters Wells Township progressing to the northeast of the hamlet of Mosherville. In the area north of Mosherville, PA 549 intersects with PA 328 and terminates. There, PA 328 takes the right-of-way from PA 549 and progresses northeast to the New York state line, where the designation terminates. The road continues northward as NY 328.

Major intersections

See also

References

External links

Pennsylvania Highways: PA 328

328
Transportation in Tioga County, Pennsylvania
Transportation in Bradford County, Pennsylvania